

Championships

Professional
Men
1997 NBA Finals:  Chicago Bulls over the Utah Jazz 4-2.  MVP:  Michael Jordan
 1997 NBA Playoffs
1996–97 NBA season
1997 NBA draft
1997 NBA All-Star Game
Eurobasket:  Yugoslavia 61, Italy 49
Women
WNBA Finals: Houston Comets over the New York Liberty.  MVP:  Cynthia Cooper
1997 WNBA Playoffs
1997 WNBA season
1997 WNBA draft
Eurobasket Women:  Lithuania def.  Slovakia

College
Men
NCAA
Division I:  University of Arizona 84, University of Kentucky 79
National Invitation Tournament:  	University of Michigan def. Florida State University
Division II: Cal State Bakersfield 57, Northern Kentucky University 56
Division III: Illinois Wesleyan University 89,  Nebraska Wesleyan University 86
NAIA
NAIA Division I:  Life University (Ga.) 73, Oklahoma Baptist University 64
NAIA Division II: Bethel College (Indiana) (IN) 95, Siena Heights College (MI) 94
NJCAA
NJCAA Division I:   Indian Hills CC, Ottumwa, Iowa 89, San Jacinto College, (TX)  80
Women
NCAA
Division I:  University of Tennessee 68, Old Dominion University 59
Division II: North Dakota State University 94, University of Southern Indiana 78
Division III New York University 72, University of Wisconsin–Eau Claire 70
NAIA
NAIA Division I: Southern Nazarene University (OK) 78 Union College (TN) (73)
NAIA Division II  Northwest Nazarene University (ID) 64, Black Hills State University (SD) 46
NJCAA
Division I Trinity Valley CC 79, Central Florida CC 69
Division II Kirkwood CC 76, Carl Sandburg College 67
Division III Anoka-Ramsey CC 80, Monroe CC 57

Preps
Bloomington North defeats Delta to win Indiana's last open-class basketball state championship.

Awards and honors

Professional
Men
NBA Most Valuable Player Award:   Karl Malone
NBA Rookie of the Year Award:  Allen Iverson
NBA Defensive Player of the Year Award:  Dikembe Mutombo
NBA Coach of the Year Award: Pat Riley, Miami Heat
Women
WNBA Most Valuable Player Award: Cynthia Cooper, Houston Comets
WNBA Defensive Player of the Year Award: Teresa Weatherspoon, New York Liberty
Kim Perrot Sportsmanship Award: Zheng Haixia, Los Angeles Sparks
WNBA Coach of the Year Award: Van Chancellor, Houston Comets
WNBA Finals Most Valuable Player Award: Cynthia Cooper, Houston Comets

Collegiate 
 Men
John R. Wooden Award: Tim Duncan, Wake Forest
Naismith College Coach of the Year: Roy Williams, Kansas
Frances Pomeroy Naismith Award: Brevin Knight, Stanford
Associated Press College Basketball Player of the Year: Tim Duncan, Wake Forest
NCAA basketball tournament Most Outstanding Player: Jeff Sheppard, Kentucky
Associated Press College Basketball Coach of the Year: Clem Haskins, Minnesota
Naismith Outstanding Contribution to Basketball: Phog Allen
 Women
Naismith College Player of the Year: Kate Starbird, Stanford
Naismith College Coach of the Year: Geno Auriemma, Connecticut
Wade Trophy: DeLisha Milton, Florida
Frances Pomeroy Naismith Award: Jennifer Howard, NC State
Associated Press Women's College Basketball Player of the Year: Kara Wolters, Connecticut
NCAA basketball tournament Most Outstanding Player: Chamique Holdsclaw, Tennessee
Carol Eckman Award: Amy Ruley, North Dakota State University
Associated Press College Basketball Coach of the Year: Geno Auriemma, Connecticut

Naismith Memorial Basketball Hall of Fame
Class of 1997:
Pete Carril
Joan Crawford
Denise Curry
Antonio Díaz-Miguel
Alex English
Don Haskins
Bailey Howell

Events
 WNBA played its first season.

Movies
Air Bud
The Sixth Man

Deaths
 January 8 — Paul Endacott, Hall of Fame player for the Kansas Jayhawks (born 1902)
 February 2 — Raimundo Saporta, former head of Real Madrid basketball and FIBA Hall of Fame member (born 1926)
 March 6 — Roger Brown, player for Indiana Pacers (born 1942)
 April 18 — Francis Johnson, American Olympic gold medalist (1936) (born 1910)
 May 16 — Bones McKinney, former coach of the Wake Forest Demon Deacons and early NBA player (born 1919)
 May 17 — Tusten Ackerman, All-American college player at Kansas (born 1901)
 June 5 — Joe Schaaf, All-American college player (Penn) (born 1908)
 September 7 — Bill Strannigan, American college coach (Colorado State, Iowa State, Wyoming) (born 1918)
 December 23 — Lester Harrison, Hall of Fame coach of the 1951 NBA Champion Rochester Royals (born 1904)

See also
 Timeline of women's basketball

References

External links